Ronald Joseph Sabal (born July 23, 1936) is a former American football player who played two seasons with the Oakland Raiders. He played college football at Purdue University.

References

1936 births
Living people
American football tackles
Purdue Boilermakers football players
Oakland Raiders players
Players of American football from Chicago
American Football League players